Mehnatobod may refer to one of three different locations in Tajikistan:

Mehnatobod, Bokhtar District, a jamoat in Khatlon Province
Mehnatobod, Hamadoni District, a jamoat in Khatlon Province
Mehnatobod, Zafarobod District, a jamoat in Sughd Province